The 2016 Big Ten Men's Lacrosse Tournament was held May 5 to May 7 at Homewood Field in  Baltimore, Maryland. The winner of the tournament received the Big Ten Conference's automatic bid to the 2016 NCAA Division I Men's Lacrosse Championship. Four teams from the Big Ten conference competed in the single elimination event. The seeds were based upon the teams' regular season conference record with Penn State winning the head-to-head tie breaker over Ohio State to earn the #4 seed and final spot in the field. In the final, Maryland beat Rutgers 14–8.

Standings
Only the top four teams in the Big Ten Conference advanced to the Big Ten Conference Tournament.

Not including Big Ten Tournament and NCAA tournament results

Schedule

Bracket
Homewood Field – Baltimore, Maryland

Awards

 MVP: Matt Rambo
 All-Tournament Team
 Ryan Brown, Johns Hopkins
 Kyle Bernlohr, Maryland
 Bryan Cole, Maryland
 Greg Danseglio, Maryland
 Connor Kelly, Maryland
 Matt Rambo, Maryland
 Nick Aponte, Penn State
 Scott Bieda, Rutgers
 Adam Charalambides, Rutgers
 Zachary Franckowiak, Rutgers

References

External links  
  2016 Big Ten Men's Lacrosse Tournament Central

Big Ten Tournament
Big Ten Conference Men's Lacrosse
Big Ten men's lacrosse tournament